Danny León (born 1 December 1994, in Móstoles) is a Spanish skateboarder. He has competed in men's park events at several World Skate Championships, finishing 19th in 2018 and 24th in 2019.Winner of the first bowl competition of skate in Amurrio city. 

He is set to compete in the men's park event at the 2020 Summer Olympics.

References 

Living people
1994 births
Spanish skateboarders
Olympic skateboarders of Spain
Skateboarders at the 2020 Summer Olympics
People from Móstoles
Sportspeople from the Community of Madrid